Qand (also known as Qāsagān, Qāsegān, and Qaşr-e Qand) is a village in Sarbuk Rural District, Sarbuk District, Qasr-e Qand County, Sistan and Baluchestan Province, Iran. At the 2006 census, its population was 98, in 19 families.

References 

Populated places in Qasr-e Qand County